Jeremy  Daniel Lusk (November 26, 1984 – February 10, 2009) was an American freestyle motocross racer from San Diego, California. He was part of the riding group Metal Mulisha.

He won gold and silver medals at the 2008 X Games and a bronze helmet in the 2008 Moto X World Championships. He was a born again Christian.

Career highlights 
2008 X Games Mexico gold, X Games Moto X Best Trick silver, X Games freestyle Gold
2008 X Games: Moto X Best Trick, Silver; Moto X Freestyle, Gold
2008 Red Bull X Fighters, 3rd
2008  Moto X Freestyle, Bronze
2008 AST Dew Tour, 3rd

Death 
On February 7, 2009, Lusk crashed while attempting to land a "Indian Air Backflip" (after Carey Hart who initiated it, see "Evolution of the backflip" in freestyle motocross) in the X Knights motocross competition in San José, Costa Rica, he under-rotated the flip, causing his front wheel to strike the landing. Lusk was ejected head-first and sustained catastrophic brain damage. Doctors performed an unsuccessful five-hour surgery at Rafael Ángel Calderón Guardia Hospital in San José in an attempt to save his life. He entered into cardiac and respiratory failure and died on February 10.

After his death, the third episode of the television show Nitro Circus was dedicated to Lusk.

At the time of his death, Lusk lived in Temecula, California, with his wife, Lauren.

References

External links 
A Fatal Flip
Metal Mulisha official website
 "Rider's Death in Competition Points to the Perils of Motocross,"  New York Times, February 10, 2009
"ESPN's Ryan Leyba's Photo Tribute"

1984 births
2009 deaths
X Games athletes
American motocross riders
Sport deaths in Costa Rica
Filmed deaths in motorsport
Freestyle motocross riders
Motorcycle racers from San Diego
Sportspeople from Temecula, California
Motorcycle racers who died while racing